Michael Avon Oeming is an American comic book creator, both as an artist and writer.

Career
Oeming is a fan of ancient mythology, having written or drawn several projects centering on the Norse gods. He frequently collaborates with long-time friend Bryan J. L. Glass and with Brian Michael Bendis. He is part of the M.O.B. crew of comic book creators, along with David Mack, Brian Bendis and Daniel Berman.

His 1998 comic book Bulletproof Monk was made into a film of the same name.

The previous mentioned collaborations are The Mice Templar from Image Comics, which he draws and co-authors with Bryan J.L. Glass, and Powers from Icon Comics which he draws, and sometimes co-authors, with Brian Bendis. His creator-owned projects include Rapture, on which he collaborated with his wife, Taki Soma, and The Victories, both for Dark Horse Comics.

As of 2010, he was employed as a staff member of Valve, working on Left 4 Dead, Team Fortress 2  and Portal 2 webcomics.

Personal life
Oeming has a son, Ethan and currently resides in Portland, Oregon with his wife, fellow writer/artist Taki Soma.

Bibliography

Writing

 Bastard Samurai (script and inks, with co-author Miles Gunter and pencils by Kelsey Shannon, 3-issue mini-series, Image Comics, April–August 2002)
 Thor #80-85: "Ragnarok" (with co-author Daniel Berman and art by Andrea Di Vito, Marvel Comics, August–December 2004, tpb, December 2004)
 Stormbreaker: The Saga of Beta Ray Bill (with co-author Daniel Berman and art by Andrea Di Vito, Marvel Comics, 6-issue limited series, January–June, 2005)
 Thor: Blood Oath (with art by Scott Kolins, 6-issue limited series, Marvel Comics, September–December 2005)
 Ares (with pencils by Travel Foreman, 5-issue limited series, Marvel Comics, March–July 2006, tpb)
 Chaos War: Ares (with pencils by Stephen Segovia and Carlos Rodriguez, one-shot, Marvel Comics, December 2010)
 Omega Flight (with pencils by Scott Kolins, 5-issue limited series, Marvel Comics, June–October 2007)
 Highlander (with co-author Brandon Jerwa and art by Lee Moder, 4-issue mini-series, Dynamite Entertainment, July 2006 – February 2007)
 Wings of Anansi
 Blood River (co-writer with Daniel Berman)
 Quixote : A modern-day retelling of Don Quixote (co-writer with Bryan Glass)
 Red Sonja
 Six (co-written with Daniel Berman)
 Spider-Man/Red Sonja (with pencils by Mel Rubi, 5-issue limited series, Marvel Comics, August–December 2007)
 Parliament of Justice
 God Complex (co-written with Daniel Berman with art by John Broglia, 6-issue limited series, December 2009 – May 2010)

Art
 Judge Dredd #1-5 (with writer Andrew Helfer, DC Comics, August–December 1994)
 Atomic Robo, Image Comics
 Bastard Samurai, Image Comics
 Bluntman and Chronic, Image Comics
 B.P.R.D.: The Soul of Venice, Dark Horse Comics
 Bulletproof Monk (pencils, with writer Brett Lewis, Image Comics, 1998–1999, tpb, 2002)
 Powers (with Brian Michael Bendis, Icon Comics, 2000–present)
 Avengers, Marvel Comics (inking)
 Daredevil, Marvel Comics (inking)
 Judge Dredd: "Straight Eye for the Crooked Guy" (with Robbie Morrison, in 2000 AD Prog 2006, December 2005)
 Parliament of Justice
 Six
 The Foot Soldiers
 What If... Thor, Marvel Comics
 The Mice Templar
 Catwoman, DC Comics
 The Team Fortress 2 web comics, up until the release of Loose Canon, when he was moved to the Left 4 Dead team.
 The Sacrifice, a webcomic based on Left 4 Dead
 Takio (with Brian Michael Bendis, 96-page graphic novel, Icon Comics, March 2011)
 Lab Rat, based on Portal and leading up to Portal 2
 Cave Carson Has a Cybernetic Eye, DC Comics/Young Aninmal, October 2016-September 2017
 Cave Carson Has an Interstellar Eye, DC Comics/Young Animal, March 2018 – present

Writing and art
 The Cross Bronx (co-author Ivan Brandon, 4-issue mini-series, Image Comics, September–December 2006)
Dick Tracy: Forever, IDW
 Hammer of the Gods (co-author Mark Wheatley, 5-issue limited series, Insight Studios Group, February–November 2001)
 Ship of Fools (co-author Bryan J.L. Glass, Caliber Comics)
 Space Sluts (pornographic parody of Star Wars)
 Victories

Awards
 2001 Eisner Award for Best New Series (for Powers)

Nominations
 2001 Eisner Award for Best Penciller/Inker or Penciller/Inker Team (for Powers)
 2006 Eagle Award for Best Comics Writer/Artist

Notes

References

Michael Avon Oeming at 2000 AD online

External links

Interviews
April 2006 Interview with the Outhouse
September 2006 interview about his Omega Flight work, Newsarama
Marvel Gazette Interview
Interview about The Rapture at Things From Another World

Artists from New Jersey
Living people
American comics writers
American comics artists
Marvel Comics people
Year of birth missing (living people)